José Rivas is the name of:
José Rivas (18th–19th century), Salvadoran military officer
José Arturo Rivas (born 1984), Mexican footballer
José Carlos Rivas (born 1989), Peruvian footballer, see Alianza Lima
José María Rivas (1958–2016), Salvadoran footballer
José Alejandro Rivas (born 1998), Venezuelan footballer

See also
José Manuel Suárez Rivas (born 1974), Spanish footballer